The Democracy Party was a political party in Myanmar.

History
Following the reintroduction of multi-party democracy after the 8888 Uprising, the Democracy Party was the first party to register when registration opened on 1 October 1988. It contested 105 seats in the 1990 general elections. It received 0.5% of the vote winning a single seat, U Tun Hlaing in the Bahan constituency in Yangon.

The party was banned by the military government on 11 March 1992.

References

Defunct political parties in Myanmar
1988 establishments in Burma
Political parties established in 1988
1992 disestablishments in Myanmar
Political parties disestablished in 1992